Pierre-Didier Jollien (born 15 December 1963) is a Swiss wrestler. He competed in the men's freestyle 82 kg at the 1988 Summer Olympics.

References

External links
 

1963 births
Living people
Swiss male sport wrestlers
Olympic wrestlers of Switzerland
Wrestlers at the 1988 Summer Olympics
Place of birth missing (living people)